Albert Gottschalk (3 July 1866 – 13 February 1906) was a Danish painter. He had a close connection, personally and artistically, to the poets Johannes Jørgensen, Viggo Stuckenberg and Sophus Claussen.

Biography
Albert Gottschalk was born in Stege on the island of Møn. but later moved to Copenhagen. He was educated at the Royal Danish Academy of Fine Arts from 1882 to 1883 and under Peder Severin Krøyer at the  Artists Studio Schools from  1883 to 1888. He also studied privately with Karl Jensen and Karl Madsen.

Gottschalk was inspired by the Danish painter P.S. Krøyer as well as French art.

Gottschalk was ambitious, technically skilled, and he worked a long time with his motifs in his mind before painting them. He searched for his motifs in Denmark on his bicycle, and he found them often around Copenhagen. The paintings often look like they are quickly made sketches which was not recognised in Gottschalk's time. But today people find his works fresher and more timeless than art from that time normally is.

Gallery

Collections 
 Statens Museum for Kunst, Copenhagen, Denmark
 Den Hirsprungske Samling, Copenhagen, Denmark
 David Collection, Denmark

See also
 Art of Denmark

References

Literature 
 Nørregård-Nielsen, Hans Edvard: "Dansk Kunst", Gyldendal, 3.udg. 2.opl. pp. 296–299

External links

ArtNet: More works by Gottschalk.

1866 births
1906 deaths
Danish landscape painters
19th-century Danish painters
Danish male painters
20th-century Danish painters
People from Møn
19th-century Danish male artists
20th-century Danish male artists